Kiekie is a genus of wandering spiders first described by D. Polotow and Antônio Domingos Brescovit in 2018. The type species, Kiekie sinuatipes, was originally described under the name "Ctenus sinuatipes".

Species
 it contains eleven species:
K. antioquia Polotow & Brescovit, 2018 – Colombia
K. barrocolorado Polotow & Brescovit, 2018 – Panama
K. curvipes (Keyserling, 1881) – Mexico, Guatemala, Honduras, Nicaragua, Costa Rica, Panama
K. garifuna Polotow & Brescovit, 2018 – Guatemala, Honduras
K. griswoldi Polotow & Brescovit, 2018 – Costa Rica
K. montanensis Polotow & Brescovit, 2018 – Costa Rica, Panama
K. panamensis Polotow & Brescovit, 2018 – Panama
K. sanjose Polotow & Brescovit, 2018 – Costa Rica
K. sarapiqui Polotow & Brescovit, 2018 – Costa Rica
K. sinuatipes (F. O. Pickard-Cambridge, 1897) (type) – Panama, Costa Rica
K. verbena Polotow & Brescovit, 2018 – Costa Rica

See also
 Ctenus
 List of Ctenidae species

References

Further reading

Ctenidae genera
Taxa named by Antônio Brescovit